Sundowning is a symptom common in dementia, mainly in Alzheimer's disease.

Sundowning may also refer to
 Sundown Syndrome, a 2009 song by Tame Impala
 Sundowning (Sleep Token album), 2019
 Sundowning (This Is Hell album), 2006